Eurymen is a small genus of marine ray-finned fishes belonging to the family Psychrolutidae, the fatheads. These fishes are found in the northern Pacific Ocean.

Species
There are currently two recognized species in this genus:
 Eurymen bassargini Lindberg, 1930
 Eurymen gyrinus C. H. Gilbert & Burke, 1912 (Smoothcheek sculpin)

References

Psychrolutidae